Cyanea may refer to:

 Cyanea (jellyfish), a genus of jellyfish in the family Cyaneidae
 Cyanea (plant), a genus of Hawaiian plants in the family Campanulaceae
 An ancient Greek name that means "blue sky" and in the Greek alphabet it's written "Κυάνεια"
 Cyanea, a species name

See also 
  Including use as a species name